Gnathium is a genus of blister beetles in the family Meloidae. There are about 16 described species in Gnathium.

Species
These 16 species belong to the genus Gnathium:

 Gnathium aetatis Scudder, 1900
 Gnathium californicum (Wickham, 1905)
 Gnathium caviceps MacSwain, 1952
 Gnathium eremicola MacSwain, 1952
 Gnathium francilloni Kirby, 1818
 Gnathium kanei Pinto, 2009
 Gnathium longicolle LeConte, 1858
 Gnathium martini MacSwain, 1952
 Gnathium minimum (Say, 1823)
 Gnathium murrayorum Pinto, 2009
 Gnathium nannulum MacSwain, 1952
 Gnathium nitidum Horn, 1870
 Gnathium obscurum MacSwain, 1952
 Gnathium politum Dillon, 1952
 Gnathium texanum Horn, 1870
 Gnathium vandykei MacSwain, 1952

References

Further reading

External links

 

Meloidae
Articles created by Qbugbot